William Girometti (Milan, 9 January 1924 – Bologna, 3 October 1998) was an Italian painter of Surrealist influence.

Biography 
William Girometti was born in Milan and spent his childhood and early years there, becoming involved with the Accademia di Brera in the period of the Second World War. At the end of the war, he began traveling and living in other Italian cities; in Ferrara, in 1954, he met the woman who would some years later become his .

In Ferrara, and in particular Pontelagoscuro, in the early 1950s, he came into contact with a group of young painters (including Tito Salomoni) with whom he would establish a strong friendship and who would encourage him in making painting his career.

Initially, in fact, he had devoted himself to sculpture, which was not completely abandoned until the end of the 1960s, as a review from 1968 demonstrates; in it, the art critic Fiorani expresses his esteem for the «sure command of expressive means», the «incisiveness of the faces», the «harmonious rhythm» and the «perfect balance between form, light and space».

Towards the end of the 1950s he spent a period of time studying and working in France, Switzerland, Austria, Germany, Denmark and Sweden before returning to Italy to divide his time between Milan and  Ferrara. In particular, he exhibited his works numerous times in Milan in shows of the Permanente.

In the 1960s he began his production, destined to become copious, of portraits and trompe-l'œil works, most of which were commissioned by private collectors and art dealers; finally settling in Bologna with his wife, he started in 1971 to lay the foundations for his Surrealist works despite continuing to produce more  on request.

In 1973, with a show inaugurated on 24 November at "Il Collezionista" art gallery in Bologna, he began to present works of a Surrealistic-Metaphysical genre in a series of exhibitions, both personal and collective, in Italy and abroad, which earned him prizes, recognition and reviews in newspapers, magazines, specialized catalogues and on Italian and European radio and television programs.

His first Surrealist works were inspired by the reality surrounding him, and were centered around themes of philosophy and ecology or dedicated to musicians and literary figures. Even his portraits acquired a surreal character.

The critics generally agreed in recognizing his «compositional elegance», «chromatic sensitivity», «impeccable technique» and «command of form», together with the emphasis on content expressed through the «interesting fusion of irony and polemic» that only seemingly results in pessimism.

A few reviews underline both the effective elaboration of the teachings of André Breton and the reference to René Magritte, with whom in particular he shared «a singularity of images» and «visual tricks» also achieved through the use of trompe-l'oeil.

Towards the end of the 1970s he invented his own graphics technique, a technique he never divulged.

He also wrote verse, and in the dépliant of the exhibit at "Il Collezionista" one of his poems was published.

A few months before dying he was gratified by a retrospective dedicated entirely to him, organized by the University and by the Comune of Bologna.

The Art of Girometti 
In 1976 the art critic Otello Mario Martinelli introduced a radio interview synthesizing the artistic development of William Girometti: «starting with his early interest in Impressionism, which dates back to 1960, yielding to his natural predisposition for the human body, he has created many portraits – also using sculpture – while his inner evolution is leading him to the painting of reality with compositions and trompe-l'oeil that he expresses with soft lines and harmonious colors. In 1971 he became interested in Surrealism».

Concerning Girometti's relationship with Surrealism, more than one critic has noted how the adherence to a pictorial movement did not prevent the artist from expressing himself in an original way, revealing the «contents of his thought» and showing a «unique personality»: «an artist who identified in Surrealism the expressive form most agreeable to him», proving himself to be "«a valid continuator» of a movement born as an «advocate of an essential inner renewal, capable of improving the very nature of a society».

Surrealism was for him «the most congenial language for expressing observations, drives and thoughts»: «a personality and a matter of commitment that support a style, rather than being supported». Girometti essentially brought about the «rehabilitation of Surrealism, not experienced passively but instead felt as a strong stimulus thanks to which the imagination manages to stand up for its rights».

A «vast humanistic culture» «represents the indispensable element for realizing oneself better without ever falling into self-satisfied intellectualism» and provides «classical ideas for new semantic inventions of line»; together with «a clear moral code» it also constitutes the basis for the «incessant work of observation and research»: the «canvases are the result of the conquest of conscience, as the artist himself says», a man who «has tenaciously delved into himself in search of his own means and specific natural inclinations».

According to Gian Mario Olivieri, instead, «the literary allusions in the figurative field, the intellectual correlations and classical quotations, the vivid sensitized colors» connect William Girometti to Magical Realism, together with those artists who work «on an ideal concept» and make «conscious use of their own means to create it».

Many critics have hypothetized about the meaning of some of his works in particular, always underlining their «difficult interpretation» and the «depth of inquiry», and the classification of the themes dealt with in general: from themes of «an existential nature and lyrical inspiration», to «themes of a social and ecological nature».

In graphics «the inspiring theme of childhood above all, and of the woman considered as a human subject, is interlaced with metaphors»; underlined on the one hand is the «refinement of certain musical instruments from whose spaces emerge with chaste discretion enigmatic infantile figures», on the other hand, «the motif of the constant presence of the young boy engaged by the artist to symbolize hope in a better future» through «continuous biological and social regeneration».

Selected works
Most of Girometti's paintings are in private collections.

1965-1973

Oil paintings 

 , portrait of Girometti's father-in-law
 Ritratto di Papa Giovanni XXIII
 La moderna dimensione della donna
 Siamo preparati alla vita in comune?
 Scelta anticonformista 
 
   
 Tempo di stress
 Recondite aspirazioni
 L'attualità di Shakespeare
 

 Ritratto della signora Tilde**
 Proteso a nuove conquiste
 Discorso su tema ecologico
 
 Rinuncia forzata
 Bononia goliardica
 
 Momenti distensivi
 
 
 Alla ricerca di una platea
 Riepilogando un discorso

1974-1981

Oil paintings 

 Trasformare, significa migliorare?
 
 
 Realtà incombente
 
 Idee per una tela bianca
 
 
 
 
 
 
 
 
 Sussurri burleschi, private collection
 
 

 Ritratto introspettivo di Marco** 
 Il fantasioso mondo di Simone
 Squarcio ecologico
 Visto: si nasca (dall'omonimo romanzo di F. Bertelli)
 
 Armonie della natura
 The great symphony
 
 Improrogabile ricerca di nuovi orizzonti
 Fantasia di note
  Ispirazione sopita Artistiche aspirazioni Scambio ambivalente La faccia nascosta 

 Graphics 
 
 
 
 
 

 1982-1991 
 Oil paintings 
 Riflessioni adolescenziali The top model  (dall'omonimo romanzo di U. Eco)  Thomas Schippers 
  (omaggio a Pier Paolo Pasolini) Il bonsai 

Solo exhibitions
 1973: Bologna, William Girometti, "Il Collezionista" art gallery, 24 November-6 December
 1974: Florence, William Girometti, "Spinetti" art gallery, 23 November-5 December
 1975: Modena, William Girometti, "Selezione d'arte e cultura" art gallery, 15–28 February
 1975: Lerici, William Girometti, "La Cattedrale" art gallery, 1–8 March
 1975: Carrara, William Girometti, "Carrara" art gallery, 26 April-9 May
 1976: Munich, Girometti William, Museum Five Continents, Berufsverband Bildender Künstler, 30 January-29 February
 1977: Ravenna, William Girometti, "Il Coccio" art gallery, 30 December 1976-14 January 1977
 1977: Bologna, William Girometti, "La Buca dell'Artista" art gallery, 20 March-3 April
 1977: Bologna, William Girometti, "Portici" art gallery, 26 March-3 April
 1978: Milan, William Girometti, "Zecchillo D'Essai" art gallery, 1–14 February
 1979: Bologna, William Girometti, "Vetrina D'Essai" art gallery, 2–21 December
 1981: Modena, William Girometti, "Emilia" art gallery, 31 January-20 February
 1998: Bologna, Le stagioni di un artista: un itinerario di vita artistica fra sculture, disegni, pittura. Retrospettiva dedicata a William Girometti, Sala Silentium, 21 April-3 May; organized by the University of Bologna and by the Comune.

 Collective Exhibitions 
 1975: Porto Verde (Misano Adriatico), Comunità Europea Artisti, 2–23 August
 1977: Bologna, Commissione Cultura Sport e Tempo Libero, 1 May-5 June
 1978: Bologna, "Portici" art gallery, 3–19 January
 1978: Bologna, Teatro Comunale, 8–10 December
 1979: Modena and Pinarella di Cervia, "Ghirlandina Arte" art gallery, 1 June-30 September
 1980: Bologna, Centro Arte e Ricerca, 14–30 June
 1980: Bologna, Circolo Artistico, 21 June-13 July
 1981: Bologna, Museo Civico, 30 July-2 August
 1981: Bologna, Palazzo d'Accursio, Salone d'Ercole, 2–31 December
 1982: Altedo, Sala Rinascita, 22–23 May
 1983: Genova-Cornigliano, Palazzo Bombrini, 14–24 January
 1983: Altedo, Sala Rinascita, 28–31 May
 1987: Bologna, Palazzo Re Enzo, Sala dei Trecento
 1998: Bologna, Primavera Spring Printemps: mostra di pittura all'aperto, Piazzetta di via San Nicolò, 29–31 May; organized by the University of Bologna and by the Comune among others.

 Prizes and awards 
 
 
 
 
 
 
 
 
 
 
 
 
 

 Picture Gallery 

 See also 
 Surrealism

 References 

 Further reading 
 L'Arco. 1974. (in Italian). 17 (May). 
 
 
 
 Cané, Frederick (May 1970). La Permanente. Milan. (in Italian).
 
 Comunità Europea Artisti, ed. (7-8-9 November 1975). "Cronaca dell'arte". L'amico libro (in Italian).
 Fiorani, C. (April 1968). La Permanente''. Milan. (in Italian).
 
 
 
 
 
 
 
 
 
 
 
 
 
 

1924 births
1998 deaths
20th-century Italian painters
20th-century Italian male artists
Italian male painters
Painters from Milan